Jane Baker may refer to:

Jane Baker, British television writer, see Pip and Jane Baker
 Jane Baker (mayor) (1923–2011), American mayor of San Mateo, California
 Jane S. Baker (born 1945), former Republican member of the Pennsylvania House of Representatives